Gorvy is a surname. Notable people with the surname include:

 Brett Gorvy (born 1964), British art dealer
 Manfred Gorvy (born 1938), London-based South African investor